The gastrosplenic ligament (also known as the ligamentum gastrosplenicum or gastrolienal ligament) is part of the greater omentum extending between the stomach and the spleen. It contains several blood vessels.

Structure 
The gastrosplenic ligament is consist of visceral peritoneum. It extends between the greater curvature of stomach and the hilum of the spleen.

Contents 
It contains the short gastric arteries and veins, and the left gastroepiploic artery and vein.

Development 
Embryonically, the gastrosplenic ligament is derived from the dorsal mesogastrium.

Clinical significance

Gastrosplenic ligament entrapment 
Small intestine may loop through a perforation in the gastrosplenic ligament, ending lateral to the spleen and stomach. This is known as gastrosplenic ligament entrapment, and is usually caused by abdominal trauma. This is corrected with surgery.

See also
 greater omentum
 Peritoneum
 Lesser omentum
 Right gastroepiploic vein

References

External links
 
 
 
 
 
 Diagram at Tn.edu
 Photo of model at Waynesburg College digirep/greateromentum
 

Abdomen